Resnick is a British television crime drama series, first broadcast on 31 March 1992, that ran for two series on BBC1. The series, based on the Charlie Resnick novels by author John Harvey, starred Academy Award-nominee Tom Wilkinson as the title character, alongside Paul Bazely, Paul Jesson, David Neilson and Daniel Ryan. The first series, an adaptation of the novel Lonely Hearts, was adapted for television by Harvey himself. Bruce MacDonald was assigned to direct.

A second series followed in 1993, slightly shorter in length than the first. The series adapted the novel Rough Treatment; again the teleplay was penned by Harvey, with Peter Smith assigned to direct. No further adaptations were created by the BBC, despite three other Resnick novels having been printed by the time of broadcast. In 2016, the series was listed for released on DVD by BBC America in the United States; a two-disc set containing both series. However, no date has yet been set for the release; despite a cover-art image being published shortly after the listing went live.

Cast
 Tom Wilkinson as DI Charlie Resnick
 Paul Bazely as DC Dipak Patel
 Kate Eaton as DC Lynn Kellogg
 William Ivory as DC Mark Devine
 Paul Jesson as Supt. Jack Skelton
 David Neilson as DS Graham Millington
 Daniel Ryan as DC Kevin Nichols
 Del Henney as DI Reg Cossall
 Graham Seed as DI Michael Grafton (Series 1)
 Chris Brailsford as DCI Tom Parker (Series 1)
 Edward Clayton as DI Jeff Harrison (Series 2)
 Mark Spalding as DI Norman Mann (Series 2)

Episodes

Series 1 (1992)

Series 2 (1993)

References

External links
 
 

1992 British television series debuts
1993 British television series endings
1990s British crime television series
1990s British drama television series
BBC television dramas
1990s British television miniseries
English-language television shows